Natica arachnoidea, common name : the spider moon snail,  is a species of predatory sea snail, a marine gastropod mollusk in the family Naticidae, the moon snails.

Description
The size of an adult shell varies between 13 mm and 26 mm.

Distribution
This marine species is distributed in the Indian Ocean along the Mascarene Basin and Mozambique; the Andamans; in the Western Pacific Ocean and Australia.

References

 Drivas, J. & M. Jay (1988). Coquillages de La Réunion et de l'île Maurice
  Kabat A.R. (2000) Results of the Rumphius Biohistorical Expedition to Ambon (1990). Part 10. Mollusca, Gastropoda, Naticidae. Zoologische Mededelingen 73(25): 345-380

External links
 
 Kabat A.R. (2000) Results of the Rumphius Biohistorical Expedition to Ambon (1990). Part 10. Mollusca, Gastropoda, Naticidae. Zoologische Mededelingen 73(25): 345-380

Naticidae
Gastropods described in 1791